Hassan Basajjabalaba is a businessman and politician in Uganda.  According to the New Vision newspaper, he is one of the wealthiest people in Uganda. He is also the chairperson of the ruling National Resistance Movement's entrepreneurs' league.

Businesses and investments
He owns the following businesses, among others:

 Kampala International University, with campuses in Kampala and Bushenyi
 Kampala International University School of Health Sciences, together with its teaching hospital with bed capacity of 1,150.
 At least two hostels outside, but near the Western Campus of KIU.
 A business that deals in hides and skins
 A tea factory at Butare in Kyamuhunga, Bushenyi District
 A tea factory at Nyakashaka in Buhweju District
 A sizable chunk of land around the Bushenyi tea factory
 A large piece of land around the Buhweju tea factory.

See also
 List of wealthiest people in Uganda
 National Resistance Movement

References

External links
Court Asks Businessman Basajabalaba to apologise to NewVision Photojournalist

Living people
Ugandan businesspeople
Date of birth missing (living people)
Ugandan Muslims
People from Bushenyi District
People from Western Region, Uganda
National Resistance Movement politicians
Year of birth missing (living people)